Vragovo is a rural locality (a village) in Sukhonskoye Rural Settlement, Mezhdurechensky District, Vologda Oblast, Russia. The population was 464 as of 2002. There are 5 streets.

Geography 
Vragovo is located 10 km southeast of Shuyskoye (the district's administrative centre) by road. Peshkovo is the nearest rural locality.

References 

Rural localities in Mezhdurechensky District, Vologda Oblast